Vasantha Sena is a 1985 Indian Malayalam-language family drama film directed by K. Vijayan and written by K. Basanth from a story by Sudhakar Mangalodayam, starring Shankar, Seema, Shobana and Ratheesh, with Mohanlal in a guest appearance. It is the story of a woman's sacrifice to help many people.

Plot

Mahesh is in love with Merlyn, who belongs to an Anglo-Indian family, but this relation is opposed by Shailaja Varma, his sister. Shailaja too had a love affair a long time back with Devan, who was killed by Shailaja's family. A conflict arises between Mahesh and Shailaja. Now Sidarth loves Shailaja and would like to marry her. Shailaja gets killed.

Cast
Shankar as Mahesh
Seema as Shailaja Varma
Shobana as Merlyn
M. G. Soman as Sidarth Menon
Ratheesh as Kishore
Mohanlal as Devan (Guest appearance)
Sukumari as Reetha
Jagathy Sreekumar as Alfred
Chithra as Nandini
Innocent as Thirumeni
Lalithasree as Victoria
Santhosh as Mathews
Thilakan as Unnithan

Soundtrack
The music was composed by Shyam and the lyrics were written by Poovachal Khader.

References

External links
 

1985 films
1980s Malayalam-language films
Indian family films
Indian drama films
Films directed by K. Vijayan